Parvin Dowlatabadi born 1924-April 15, 2008 was an Iranian children's author and poet.

Studying interior photography in the United Kingdom, she was one of the founders of the Children’s Book Council of Iran. She had written 20 books for children, including “Sparrow and Toad”, “A Glance at Children’s Literature”, and “One Actor”.

She died on April 15, 2008, aged 84, of a heart attack in Tehran.

References

1924 births
2008 deaths
Iranian writers
Iranian expatriates in the United Kingdom